Lučice may refer to:

Lučice, Fojnica, a village in Bosnia and Herzegovina
Lučice (Havlíčkův Brod District), a village in Czech Republic
Lučice (Prijepolje), a village in Serbia
 Lučice, Croatia, a village near Delnice

See also
Lučica (disambiguation)